The Company of the Occident was a French Crown corporation that existed from 1664 to 1667. Its purpose was to exploit the resources of the French colonies and compete with the powerful Dutch and English companies.

Louis XIV had ambitions to develop his new colony of New France.  This was seen as a way of funding these efforts.  Spearheaded by Minister of Finance Jean-Baptiste Colbert, the letters patent creating the Compagnie de l'Occident were issued in May 1664.  All property rights in French possessions in North and South America, and also the west coast of Africa, were vested in the company.

The company was shut down in 1674.

A Compagnie d'Occident was founded in 1718 by French Banker Antoine Crozat after the 's bankruptcy.

See also
 Chartered company
 European chartered companies founded around the 17th century (in French)

1664 establishments in France
New France
Chartered companies
Companies established in 1664
1660s in France
1670s in France
1674 disestablishments
1664 in France
Trading companies established in the 17th century
Trading companies of France